Alexander Eric McAllister (born 19 December 1920) is a Scottish former cricketer, who played one first-class match for the Scotland cricket team in 1950. McAllister played his domestic cricket for Clydesdale Cricket Club in Glasgow, captaining the team from 1950 to 1952. Upon the death of Archie Scott in November 2019, McAllister became the oldest living person to have played cricket for Scotland.

References

External links
 

1920 births
Living people
Scottish cricketers
Sportspeople from Paisley, Renfrewshire
Scottish centenarians
Men centenarians